Christian Drăgoi (born April 1982) is a Romanian footballer playing with Oakland County FC in the National Premier Soccer League.

Playing career 
Dragoi began his career in 2002 with Poli Iasi in the Divizia B, where he won promotion to the Divizia A. In 2005, he went overseas to America to play college soccer at St. John's University. After graduating from St.. John's he played with the Brooklyn Knights in the USL Premier Development League. At the conclusion of the PDL season he returned to Europe to play in the Serie C with Varese Calcio S.S.D. in 2007/2008. In 2011, he signed with KS Kastrioti in the Albanian Superliga. Throughout his time in Albania he also played with KF Vllaznia Shkodër, and FK Kukësi. During the Albanian offseason he played abroad in Canada with the Windsor Stars, and London City in the Canadian Soccer League. In 2014, he returned to American once more to play with RWB Adria in the Premier League of America, and the following season he played in the National Premier Soccer League with Detroit City FC, and Oakland County FC.

References

External links 
St. John's University Athletics bio

1982 births
Living people
Romanian footballers
Romanian expatriate footballers
FC Politehnica Iași (1945) players
Brooklyn Knights players
KS Kastrioti players
KF Vllaznia Shkodër players
Windsor City FC players
FK Kukësi players
London City players
Detroit City FC players
Liga II players
USL League Two players
Kategoria Superiore players
Expatriate footballers in Albania
Expatriate soccer players in Canada
Romanian expatriate sportspeople in the United States
Romanian expatriate sportspeople in Albania
Canadian Soccer League (1998–present) players
National Premier Soccer League players
Association football midfielders